Petula Clark's Hit Parade is a compilation album of Clark's biggest hits to date.  This unofficial 'greatest hits' album released on Clark's British label Pye, was only released in the UK however.  The US wouldn't see a 'greatest hits' until Warner Bros. released Petula Clark's Greatest Hits, Vol. 1 at the end of 1968.  Two of Clark's hit singles, previously unreleased on an LP were included on the Hit Parade album; "Round Every Corner" (#21 US) and "You'd Better Come Home" (#22 US).  The album is largely a collection of Tony Hatch's arrangements and songwriting.

Track listing

Personnel
 Petula Clark - lead vocals
 Tony Hatch - arranger, orchestra director
 Johnny Harris - arranger, orchestra director

Charts

Petula Clark albums
1966 greatest hits albums
Albums conducted by Johnny Harris (musician)
Albums conducted by Tony Hatch
Albums arranged by Tony Hatch
Albums produced by Tony Hatch
Pye Records compilation albums